Minuscule 207 (in the Gregory-Aland numbering), ε 126 (Soden), is a Greek minuscule manuscript of the New Testament, on parchment. Palaeographically it has been assigned to the 11th century. The manuscript is lacunose. It has marginalia.

Description 

The codex contains the text of the four Gospels on 267 parchment leaves (size ), with some lacunae (Matthew 1:1-13; Mark 1:1-11 - for the sake of illuminations). It is written in two columns per page, in 22 lines per page.

There is also a division according to the Ammonian Sections (in Mark 241 sections), (no references to the Eusebian Canons).

Text 

The Greek text of the codex is a representative of the Byzantine text-type. Hermann von Soden classified it as a member of the textual family Kx. Aland placed it in Category V.
According to the Claremont Profile Method it represents the textual family Kx in Luke 1 and Luke 20. In Luke 10 no profile was made.

The text of the Pericope Adulterae (John 7:53-8:11) is placed at the end of the Gospel of John.

History 

The manuscript once belonged to Basilios Bessarion. According to the inscription it once belonged to A. F. R.

The manuscript was examined by Birch and Burgon. C. R. Gregory saw it in 1886.

It is currently housed at the Biblioteca Marciana (Gr. Z 8), at Venice.

See also 

 List of New Testament minuscules
 Biblical manuscript
 Textual criticism

References

Further reading 

 L. Politis, Paléographie et litérature Byzantine et néo-grecque VI (1975), p. 23.

Greek New Testament minuscules
11th-century biblical manuscripts